Ceretapa or Keretapa, also called Diocaesarea or Diocaesareia or Diokaisareia (Διοκαισάρεια), was a Graeco-Roman town of Phrygia Pacatiana. It minted coins bearing the demonym Κερεταπεύς. The coins also show that there was near it a river or fountain Aulindenus. It was a bishopric with Silvanus representing the city at the Council of Ephesus, 431. No longer the seat a residential bishop, it remains a titular see of the Roman Catholic Church.

Its site is tentatively located near Kayadibi in Asiatic Turkey.

References

Populated places in Phrygia
Former populated places in Turkey
Catholic titular sees in Asia
History of Burdur Province
Roman towns and cities in Turkey